The 1956 Italian Grand Prix was a Formula One motor race held on 2 September 1956 at Monza. It was the eighth and final race of the 1956 World Championship of Drivers.

Coming into the race, Juan Manuel Fangio had an eight-point lead over Ferrari teammate Peter Collins and Jean Behra, driving for Maserati.

Fangio retired with a broken steering arm, while Behra also had to pull out. Luigi Musso, also driving for Ferrari, was told to hand his car over to Fangio to ensure the Argentine's third consecutive title but he refused. Brit Collins, with the opportunity for his first world championship, sportingly handed his car over to Fangio during a routine pit-stop. Fangio finished second, behind Stirling Moss, giving himself and Collins a share of the points for second place and ensuring his fourth title.

The race saw the World Championship debuts of Jo Bonnier, Les Leston and Wolfgang von Trips and the final World Championship appearances for Hermano da Silva Ramos, Toulo de Graffenried, Robert Manzon, Piero Taruffi and Luigi Villoresi. Ron Flockhart scored his first World Championship points (and podium finish) and it was the first World Championship race led by Luigi Musso. With Collins having a share  of second place this was the first World Championship Grand Prix in which British drivers finished one-two-three.

Classification

Qualifying

Race

Notes
 – Includes 1 point for fastest lap

Shared drives and championship permutations
 Shared Drives:
 Car #26: Peter Collins (35 laps) and Juan Manuel Fangio (15 laps). They shared the 6 points for second place.
 Car #22: Juan Manuel Fangio (30 laps) and Eugenio Castellotti (16 laps).
 Car #46: Umberto Maglioli (31 laps) and Jean Behra (11 laps).
 Car #34: Luigi Villoresi (4 laps) and Jo Bonnier (3 laps).
Two drivers were fighting for the championship going into the race: Fangio on 30 points and Collins on 22 points
Fangio would finish ahead of Collins in the Championship if: 
Collins doesn't win the race or
Collins wins the race without fast lap and Fangio finished at least 3rd with fastest lap or
Fangio finished at least 2nd
Collins would finish ahead of Fangio in the Championship if:
Collins wins the race with fastest lap and Fangio finished 3rd or lower or
Collins wins the race without fastest lap and Fangio finished 3rd or lower without fastest lap as well

Championship standings after the race 
Drivers' Championship standings

Note: Only the top five positions are included. Only the best 5 results counted towards the Championship. Numbers without parentheses are Championship points; numbers in parentheses are total points scored.

References

Italian Grand Prix
Italian Grand Prix
European Grand Prix
1956 in Italian motorsport